Harry William Alfred Howlett (23 June 1910 – 1989) was an English footballer who played as a centre forward for Rochdale and Nottingham Forest.

References

Rochdale A.F.C. players
Nottingham Forest F.C. players
Spennymoor Town F.C. players
Shildon A.F.C. players
Cockfield F.C. players
Crook Town A.F.C. players
Bishop Auckland F.C. players
Portsmouth F.C. players
West Stanley F.C. players
Poole Town F.C. players
AFC Bournemouth players
People from Shildon
Footballers from County Durham
1910 births
1989 deaths
English footballers
Association football forwards